Newton Highlands is one of the thirteen villages within the city of Newton in Middlesex County, Massachusetts, United States. The Newton Highlands Historic District includes residential and commercial businesses back to the late 19th century.

History
John Haynes owned much of the land that is now Newton Highlands in 1635. He was the governor of the Massachusetts Bay Colony. The area was primarily farm land until train service was brought to the area. The Charles River Railroad extended its service in the Newton, Massachusetts area, from Brookline to Newton Highlands. It was called the Highlands Branch. Initially, train service was just for commercial traffic. In the 1870s, commuter service was extended from Boston to the village. 

The historic commuter suburb was platted after 1852 when the Charles River Railroad was first built. The streets included Floral, Lincoln, Walnut, and Hyde Streets. Land north of Lincoln Street was subdivided for more streets in 1871. As the village was settled in 1870s, houses were built of Mansard, Colonial Revival, Italianate, and other forms of Victorian architecture. Late 19-century historic houses, some businesses, the Newton Congregational Church, and the Hyde School are located in the Newton Highlands Historic District. Boston architects designed brick buildings to replace old wooden schoolhouses in the 1890s. Hartwell and Richardson designed the Hyde School, which was dedicated in 1895. The first Brigham's Ice Cream shop was located in Newton Highlands.

Train service
Newton Highlands has two Massachusetts Bay Transportation Authority (MBTA) stops on the Green Line at the Newton Highlands station.

Notable people
 Benjamin Franklin Trueblood (1847–1916) was an American pacifist who served the American Peace Society for 23 years

See also
 National Register of Historic Places listings in Newton, Massachusetts

References

Bibliography
 

Villages in Newton, Massachusetts
Villages in Massachusetts